Jeffrey S. Rabhan (May 7, 1970) is an American music industry executive, artist manager, Arts Professor and former Chair of the Clive Davis Institute of Recorded Music at Tisch School of the Arts, New York University (NYU). He currently serves as Executive Director of Los Angeles Academy for Artists & Music Production.

Early life
Rabhan was born in Savannah, Georgia and raised in Richmond, Virginia. He studied journalism at New York University, receiving a Bachelor of Arts degree. Shortly after graduation, Rabhan was offered a post at Rolling Stone.

Career
After leaving Rolling Stone and moving to SPIN magazine on the West Coast, Rabhan was offered a position at Atlantic Records, ultimately serving as Senior Director of A&R and Soundtracks. He was subsequently named Executive in Charge of Soundtracks at Elektra Records, overseeing the soundtrack releases of Beautiful Girls and Four Rooms.

Rabhan began working as an independent music supervisor and A&R consultant, discovering the pop trio Hanson and supervising the Scream soundtrack. He was then offered a position at Los Angeles-based entertainment company The Firm, Inc., as partner working alongside founder Jeff Kwatinetz. While At The Firm, he worked closely with artists including DMX, Jermaine Dupri, Kelly Clarkson, and Michelle Branch.

In 2006 Rabhan left The Firm to launch his own management company, Three Ring Projects, which had publishing and label imprints through Universal Music Group. The entity embraced multiple forms of media, fashion and lifestyle products, brokering deals for clients with brands such as Boost Mobile, Heineken, and Ford Motor Company. At Three Ring, he helped parlay Elliott Yamin's (American Idol) appearance into the highest chart debut by a new artist on an independent label in Soundscan history, and managed artists including Kelis, Everlast, and Jermaine Dupri.

Rabhan took over as Chair of the Clive Davis Institute of Recorded Music at Tisch School of the Arts, NYU, in 2010, while continuing to advise companies and artists. He wrote Cool Jobs in the Music Business, a book that explains music business career options to high school and college students, released by inTune/Hal Leonard in February 2013.

Works
 Cool Jobs In The Music Business (2013) -

References

External links 

Living people
1970 births
New York University alumni
New York University faculty
American music industry executives